Carleson is a Swedish patronymic surname. Notable people with the surname include:

C. N. Carleson (1865–1929), Swedish politician
Edvard Carleson (1820–1884), Swedish politician
Lennart Carleson (born 1928), Swedish mathematician
Per Carleson (1917–2004), Swedish fencer
Robert B. Carleson (1931–2006), American presidential advisor

See also
Carlson (disambiguation)